Lispocephala brachialis is a fly from the family Muscidae.

Description
A small fly of 4-5.5mm, and distinctly more yellow that other species of the same genus. All tarsi dark at the apex. Legs are yellow, apart from the front femora.

Distribution
Rare in Great Britain (England only), More common in Central and Southern Europe, as far south as North Africa.

References

Muscidae
Diptera of Europe
Insects described in 1877
Taxa named by Camillo Rondani